Child of the Sun is a collection of buildings designed by Frank Lloyd Wright on the campus of the Florida Southern College in Lakeland, Florida. The twelve original buildings were constructed between 1941 and 1958. Another of Wright's designs, a Usonian house originally intended for faculty housing, was completed in 2013, and is now part of the Sharp Family Tourism and Education Center. On March 2, 2012, it was designated a National Historic Landmark. The buildings are listed on the National Register of Historic Places, and together form the largest collection of buildings by the architect Frank Lloyd Wright.

Design
Frank Lloyd Wright was retained by Florida Southern President Ludd M. Spivey in 1938 to develop a master plan for the expansion and growth of the college's campus. Wright was given the opportunity to the plan the campus using ideas about organic integration with the environment that the architect had been developing for some years. As basic design blocks for the campus, Wright adopted a plan based on the idea of orange groves, which have evenly spaced trees forming a grid. For construction, Wright used of textile blocks, which he had developed formally a decade before in his "Textile Block" houses in California. The buildings on the Florida Southern campus could be made of concrete blocks of standard size, whose use  simplified design and construction of the buildings. Some of these  blocks were formed by the college's students using local materials. The basic plan for the campus was based on ideas Wright had conceived as part of his Broadacre City idea of urban planning.

Sharp Family Tourism and Education Center 

Opened in 2013, the Sharp Family Tourism and Education Center features a Wright-designed Usonian house and the GEICO Gift Shop. The center offers self-guided, docent-led, and group tours of this collection of the architect's work that Wright himself proclaimed to be among his best. It is open from 9:30 a.m. to 4:30 p.m.

Buildings 

The buildings within the district include:
 Annie Pfeiffer Chapel first completed Frank Lloyd Wright structure on the campus, dedicated 1941
 Seminars (now the Financial Aid and Business Office) completed 1941
 Buckner Building (original Roux Library) completed 1946
 Watson/Fine Building (Administration Building) completed 1949
 Water Dome partially completed 1949, completed and restored in 2007 to Wright's original plans
 Danforth Chapel completed 1955
 Ordway Building (originally called the Industrial Arts Building) completed 1952
 Polk County Science Building (called Polk Science by faculty and students) completed 1958
 The Esplanades various completion times, currently undergoing restoration

Gallery

See also
List of Frank Lloyd Wright works
List of National Historic Landmarks in Florida
National Register of Historic Places listings in Polk County, Florida

References

External links

Critique of the Child of the Sun
Child of the Sun Visitor Center

Frank Lloyd Wright buildings
Buildings and structures in Lakeland, Florida
National Register of Historic Places in Polk County, Florida
National Historic Landmarks in Florida
Historic districts on the National Register of Historic Places in Florida
Museums in Polk County, Florida
University museums in Florida
Architecture museums in the United States
Biographical museums in Florida
Historic American Buildings Survey in Florida
Modernist architecture in Florida
Florida Southern College
1975 establishments in Florida